Anare Pass is a broad ice-covered pass in Antarctica at  above sea level. The pass is the highest point on the glaciers that delimit the south side of the Anare Mountains, separating the latter from the Admiralty Mountains and the Concord Mountains to the south. Mapped by the United States Geological Survey from surveys and U.S. Navy air photos, 1960–63, and named by the Advisory Committee on Antarctic Names in association with the nearby Anare Mountains. The mountain pass is situated on the Pennell Coast, a portion of Antarctica lying between Cape Williams and Cape Adare.

References
 

Mountain passes of Victoria Land
Pennell Coast